Sersheim is a municipality in the district of Ludwigsburg in Baden-Württemberg in Germany.

References

Ludwigsburg (district)